Chanté Adams (born December 16, 1994) is an American actress. She starred in the 2017 biopic Roxanne Roxanne, for which she received the Sundance Special Jury Prize for Breakthrough Performance.

Life and career 
Adams was born and raised in Detroit, Michigan. She began acting as a student at Cass Technical High School. She received her bachelor's degree from Carnegie Mellon University's School of Drama, after which she moved to New York to pursue an acting career.

One month after moving to New York, Adams was invited to audition for the lead role in a biopic about rapper Roxanne Shanté. She was cast in the role and filming began eight days later. For her performance in Roxanne Roxanne, Adams received the Special Jury Prize for Breakthrough Performance at 2017 Sundance.

Adams has appeared in the films Monsters and Men (2018), Bad Hair (2020), and The Photograph (2020).

In 2021, Adams starred opposite Michael B. Jordan in the romantic drama A Journal for Jordan, directed by Denzel Washington. She co-stars in the 2022 Amazon television adaptation of A League of Their Own along with D'Arcy Carden, Abbi Jacobson, Roberta Colindrez, Kelly McCormack, and Priscilla Delgado.

Filmography

Film

Television

Broadway

Awards and nominations

References

External links 
Chanté Adams on IMDb
Official Instagram

1994 births
Living people
African-American actresses
Actresses from Detroit
Cass Technical High School alumni
Carnegie Mellon University alumni
21st-century American actresses
21st-century African-American women
21st-century African-American people
Entertainers from Michigan